Emily Elizabeth may refer to:

Characters 
Emily Elizabeth Howard from Clifford the Big Red Dog

People 
Emily Elizabeth Beavan
Emily Elizabeth Carpenter
Emily Elizabeth Dickinson
Emily Elizabeth Douglas
Emily Elizabeth Holman
Emily Elizabeth Jones
Emily Elizabeth Veeder
Emily Elizabeth Parsons